The 1990 Continental Airlines London Masters was a professional invitational snooker tournament which took place from 10 October 1989 to 15 May 1990 at the Café Royal in London, England.

Stephen Hendry won the tournament beating John Parrott 4–2 in the final for the second consecutive year.

Main draw

References

London Masters (snooker)
1990 in snooker
1990 in English sport